Druzhba (Duślıq) is a rural locality (a selo) in Polyakovsky Selsoviet, Davlekanovsky District, Bashkortostan, Russia. The population was 305 as of 2010. There are 2 streets.

Geography 
Druzhba is located 10 km northeast of Davlekanovo (the district's administrative centre) by road. Bishkain is the nearest rural locality.

References 

Rural localities in Davlekanovsky District